The Minnesota Correctional Facility – Faribault is a state prison located in Faribault, Minnesota.  As of March 2023, it had an adult inmate population of about 2,000 men, making it the largest prison in Minnesota by population.

The facility is built on land the state has managed and maintained since 1879 when it was founded as, "Minnesota Experimental School for the Feeble Minded."  This included children who were, "Deaf and Dumb and the blind."  In 1882 it expanded its population to 50 students and again grew in 1887 to 303 students. In 1894, the location added a school for girls (130 students) called, "Sunnyside" (later changed to Chippewa). In 1895, the school for girls expanded to 160 and added a zoo and merry-go-arounds on campus (total population 500 in 1896). In 1898 the first Psychologist ever employed in an Institution, A.R.T. Wylie, with many publishing being written in the Journal of Psycho-Asthenics. In 1900, a hospital opened on the location, named the "Oaks", which specialized in the treatement of epileptic boys beginning in 1901 (total population 889 in 1902). By 1904 there were 500 beds for the boys and girls placed in the hospital, and 28 beds for children struggling with tuberculosis were added in 1905.

Due to a number of deaths at the facility, a cemetery was created on the south side of the main campus, with the first residential burial taking place in 1905. The cemetery is still open and cared for by inmates who reside at the facility.

In 1909, 507 acres of farmland was purchased for expansion of the facilities.  In 1913 tunnels (which are still accessible) and ceiling tracks were installed to make deliveries and travel from building-to-building without going outside. Expansions were made every few years, adding new buildings, most of which still exist and are used by staff and inmates. By 1955, the population of the new Faribault State Hospital was 3,355, and 639 staff. In 1968, the working farm on the facility and many buildings were closed duew to decreasing population. In 1985, Faribault State Hospital (1970–1985) changed its name to "Faribault Regional Center."  In 1987, The State Legislature authorized a bill for MN Corrections to take over FRC grounds. The model for caring for mentally disadvantaged had changed to a more community-based help and support system.

The prison was officially established in 1989 on the  campus of the former state mental hospital.

 Between 2005 and 2008, the Minnesota legislature funded a $129 million expansion and modernization program, which included the construction of four new 416-bed living units. The prison's medium-security inmates are now primarily housed within these four large "K" buildings, so called because each building consists of four wings in a "K" configuration around a central control rotunda, with each two-story wing capable of housing 104 inmates in two-bunk cells.

The expansion of the Faribault prison was a primary cause of the state's decreased reliance upon a private prison in Appleton, Minnesota. Corrections Corporation of America closed the 1,600-bed Appleton prison in 2010.

MCF-Faribault has educational facilities for GED and adult basic education, and provides education in construction trades such as flooring, drywall, and woodworking. The facility also houses a MINNCOR prison industry facility providing contract labor to outside vendors as well as a line of institutional and library furniture. The 180 bed "New Dimensions" chemical dependency treatment program provides a 6-12 month treatment program for alcohol and other drug-dependent offenders.  The minimum security unit, outside of the main prison's medium-security double fence, provides housing and supervision for community work crews.

Notable inmates
Harvey Carignan
Donald Blom: A registered sex offender involved in five cases of kidnapping and sexual assault prior to his current murder charge, he is suspected of being a serial killer by case investigators.

References

External links
Minnesota Correctional Facility – Faribault

Prisons in Minnesota
Buildings and structures in Faribault, Minnesota
Defunct hospitals in Minnesota
1989 establishments in Minnesota